Supercop is the soundtrack to the US version of the 1992 Hong Kong action film Supercop. It was released on July 30, 1996 via Interscope Records and consists of various types of music including alternative rock and hip hop. The soundtrack was not much of a success, only making it to #133 on the Billboard 200, but Warren G and Adina Howard's cover of "What's Love Got to Do With It" made it #32 on the Billboard Hot 100 and #5 on the Hot Rap Songs. 2Pac's rhyme with the Outlawz on this soundtrack would reappear as the only single to the Gang Related – The Soundtrack after his death following Supercop's release.

Track listing

Charts

References

External links

1996 soundtrack albums
Hip hop soundtracks
Albums produced by Warren G
Alternative rock soundtracks
Albums produced by Danny Saber
Interscope Records soundtracks
Albums produced by Joel McNeely
Albums produced by Daz Dillinger
Action film soundtracks